Doylestown is a borough and the county seat of Bucks County in Pennsylvania, United States.
 north of Center City, Philadelphia,
It constitutes part of the Delaware Valley (i.e. the Philadelphia metro area).

As of the 2020 census, the borough population was 8,300.

History 

Like most of the region, the area of Doylestown was inhabited by the Lenape people until the arrival of the Europeans.

Doylestown's origins date to March 1745 when William Doyle obtained a license to build a tavern on what is now the northwest corner of Dyers Road and Coryell's Ferry Road (now Main and State Streets). Known for years as "William Doyle's Tavern," its strategic location, at the intersection of the road (now U.S. Route 202) linking Swede's Ford (Norristown) and Coryell's Ferry (New Hope) and the road (now PA Route 611) linking Philadelphia and Easton, allowed the hamlet to grow into a village. The first church was erected in 1815, followed by a succession of congregations throughout the 19th century.

A second inn, the Sign of the Ship was established in 1774, built diagonally across from the Doyle Tavern. Samuel Flack was innkeeper in 1778.

As the population of Central and Upper Bucks County grew throughout the 18th and into the 19th century, discontent developed with the county seat's location in Newtown, where it had been since 1725. Eight petitions with a total of 184 signers were submitted to the General Assembly, some as early as 1784, requesting the move of the county seat to Doylestown. Among the signers were Andrew Armstrong, John Armstrong, John Davis, Andrew Denison, Jesse Fell, Joseph Fell, John Ingham (of Ingham Springs), Michael Frederick Kolb, Zebulon M. Pike (of Lumberton), Samuel Preston, Robert Shewell, Walter Shewell, and Fulkerd Sebring. The General Assembly approved the move by an Act on February 28, 1810, and the first Court session was opened on May 11, 1813. An outgrowth of Doylestown's new courthouse was the development of "lawyers row", a collection of Federal-style offices. One positive consequence of early 19th-century investment in the new county seat was organized fire protection, which began in 1825 with the Doylestown Fire Engine Company.

A post office was established on January 1, 1802. Charles Stewart, the first postmaster, carried letters to recipients in the bell-shaped crown of his high beaver hat as he walked about the village. When Stewart died on February 7, 1804, his son-in-law Enoch Harvey became the next postmaster. On October 9, 1804 Harvey advertised in the Pennsylvania Correspondent, published in Doylestown, of a list of letters remaining in the post office for Wm. R. Hanna, Esq., Newtown; Doct. Felix Robertson, Bucks County; Robert Wehir, Shamony, Bucks County; Robert A. Farmer, Esq., Birdsborough; Israel Childs, Buckingham.

A bill to erect Doylestown into a borough was introduced into Legislature in February 1830, but failed, as well as a second attempt in the session of 1832. "An Act to erect the Village of Doylestown, in the County of Bucks, into a Borough" was passed and signed into law by Governor Joseph Ritner on April 16, 1838.

An electric telegraph station was built in 1846, and the North Pennsylvania Railroad completed a branch to Doylestown in 1856. The first gas lights were introduced in 1854. Because of the town's relatively high elevation and a lack of strong water power, substantial industrial development never occurred and Doylestown evolved to have a professional and residential character.

During the mid-19th century, several large tracts located east of the courthouse area were subdivided into neighborhoods. The next significant wave of development occurred after the Civil War, when the  Magill property to the southwest of the town's core was subdivided for residential lots.

In 1869, Doylestown established a water works. The first telephone line arrived in 1878, the same year that a new courthouse was erected.  1897 saw the first of several trolley lines connecting Doylestown with Willow Grove, Newtown and Easton. A private sewer system and treatment plant were authorized in 1903. The Borough took over and expanded sewer service to about three-quarters of the town in 1921.

In the early 20th century, Doylestown became best known to the outside world through the "Tools of the Nation-Maker" museum of the Bucks County Historical Society. Henry Chapman Mercer constructed the reinforced concrete building in 1916 to house his collection of mechanical tools and utensils. Upon his death in 1930, Mercer also left his similarly constructed home Fonthill and adjacent Moravian Pottery and Tile Works, to be operated as a museum. The home was left on the condition that his housekeeper be allowed to live there for the rest of her life. She lived there and gave tours until the mid-1970s.

In 1916, Doylestown Country Club was established and still operates a private golf course and caddy program.

By 1931, the advent of the automobile and improved highway service had put the last trolley line out of business as Doylestonians used the automobile as the primary means of travel within the region. The Great Depression took its toll, as many grand old houses constructed a century earlier fell into disrepair. During the 1930s, the Borough also expanded its land area to the north by admission of the tract known as the Doylestown Annex.

In the decade following World War II, Doylestown's business community boomed. During the 1940s, streets were paved for the first time in two decades and parking meters were introduced downtown in 1948. However, the postwar housing boom did not begin in earnest until the 1950s, when 550 new homes were built. The housing boom continued into the 1960s and 1970s, as more than 1,600 new homes were built during those decades and the Borough's population grew from 5,917 in 1960 to 8,717 in 1980.

As with many small towns across the country, the growth of the postwar decades also brought a new competitor to the downtown business district, the shopping mall. By the 1960s, the toll could be seen in Doylestown by the numerous vacant buildings and dilapidated storefronts in the center of town. The Bucks County Redevelopment Authority responded with a federal urban renewal scheme that called for the demolition of 27 historic buildings. The local business community objected to such wholesale clearance and responded with its own plan called Operation '64, the Doylestown Plan for Self-Help Downtown Renewal. This private initiative was successful in saving Doylestown's old buildings and historic character, while improving business at the same time. One historic landmark that could not be saved was the 80-year-old courthouse and clock tower, which was replaced by the present county complex in the early 1960s.

By the end of the 1980s, the downtown business district was again showing the toll of massive new competition from the latest wave of suburban shopping centers, as well as the recession that hit hardest in the northeastern states. In response, the Borough Council established a volunteer group of civic-minded representatives from business organizations, government, and the residential community to begin formulating plans for the downtown area in 1992. This effort resulted in streetscape improvements composed of cast iron street lamps and brick pavers, facade improvements and other beautification efforts, and the establishment of a Main Street Manager Program.

As the 1990s progressed, the downtown area rebuilt itself largely by turning to an out-of-town audience. Doylestown had long been respected as a bucolic tourist destination. The gentry of Philadelphia and New York, including figures of the Manhattan theater and literary scenes, maintained country estates in the area and often summered there. The Mercer Museum, Moravian Pottery and Tile Works, and the local National Shrine of Our Lady of Czestochowa brought a regular stream of short-term visitors through the area as well. With charitable support, the art deco County Theater was restored and reopened showing art-house fare, and a new main library and art museum were built around the ruins of the old stone jail, across the street from the Mercer Museum. An official "resort town" designation exempted the area from liquor license caps, and empty commercial space began to fill with a dense and vibrant nighttime scene of bars and restaurants.

This development goes hand in hand with the broader development of the region. As the Philadelphia metropolitan area expanded from southern into central Bucks County, the fields and farms of the communities around Doylestown quickly began to sprout housing developments. This development brought thousands of people to the area, but the neighborhoods created often lacked longstanding institutions or discernible centers. Doylestown, more centrally located than the Delaware River border town of New Hope, which had traditionally served this function, was able to position itself as the regional center of culture and nightlife.

Archival collection and community programming are two functions of the Doylestown Historical Society, established in 1995, whose mission is "to commemorate and preserve the history of Doylestown so that its people, places and events may long be remembered."

The Doylestown Historic District, Pugh Dungan House, Fonthill, Fountain House, Oscar Hammerstein II Farm, James-Lorah House, Mercer Museum, Moravian Pottery and Tile Works, and Shaw Historic District are listed on the National Register of Historic Places.

Geography
Doylestown Borough is bordered by Doylestown Township, except to the northeast where it borders Buckingham Township.

Natural features of Doylestown Borough include Cooks Run and Neshaminy Creek.

Climate

According to the Köppen climate classification system, Doylestown has a hot-summer, humid continental climate (Dfa). Dfa climates are characterized by at least one month having an average mean temperature ≤ , at least four months with an average mean temperature ≥ , at least one month with an average mean temperature ≥  and no significant precipitation difference between seasons. Although most summer days are slightly humid in Doylestown, episodes of heat and high humidity can occur with heat index values > . The average wettest month is July which corresponds with the annual peak in thunderstorm activity. Episodes of extreme cold and wind can occur with wind chill values < . Ice storms and large snowstorms depositing ≥  of snow occur once every few years, particularly during nor’easters from December through February.

Demographics

As of the 2010 census, the borough was 94.8% Non-Hispanic White, 2.3% Black or African American, 0.2% Native American, 1.9% Asian, 0.1% Pacific Islander, and 1.5% were two or more races. 2.8% of the population were of Hispanic or Latino ancestry .

As of the census of 2000, there were 8,227 people, 3,952 households, and 1,908 families residing in the borough.  The population density was 3,822.5 people per square mile (1,477.4/km²).  There were 4,055 housing units at an average density of 1,884.1 per square mile (728.2/km²).  The racial makeup of the borough was 95.24% White, 0.30% African American, 0.11% Native American, 1.42% Asian, 0.07% Pacific Islander, 0.43% from other races, and 0.63% from two or more races. Hispanic or Latino of any race were 2.20% of the population

There were 3,952 households, out of which 19.0% had children under the age of 18 living with them, 39.0% were married couples living together, 7.2% had a female householder with no husband present, and 51.7% were non-families. 44.4% of all households were made up of individuals, and 22.8% had someone living alone who was 65 years of age or older.  The average household size was 1.98 and the average family size was 2.82.

In the borough, the population was spread out, with 16.5% under the age of 18, 5.7% from 18 to 24, 28.8% from 25 to 44, 23.5% from 45 to 64, and 25.4% who were 65 years of age or older.  The median age was 44 years. For every 100 females there were 79.3 males.  For every 100 females age 18 and over, there were 75.7 males.

The median income for a household in the borough was $46,148, and the median income for a family was $71,988. Males had a median income of $48,553 versus $31,703 for females. The per capita income for the borough was $32,249.  About 2.5% of families and 4.4% of the population were below the poverty line, including 1.7% of those under age 18 and 9.6% of those age 65 or over.

Arts and culture 

Doylestown Borough is home to three structures designed and built by Henry Chapman Mercer.  The Mercer Museum, a structure built in poured concrete, is the home to Mercer's collection of early American artifacts.  It also houses a collection known as "Tools of the Nation-Maker", one of the most important of its kind in the world. Bucks County Historical Society also maintains the Spruance Library, a research library, adjoining the museum. Fonthill (also known as "Mercer's Castle") was Mercer's home and houses his collection of artifacts from around the world.  The Moravian Pottery and Tile Works is an operational facility utilizing the tools and techniques used by Pennsylvania German potters in the 18th and 19th centuries.

The former prison, across the street from the Mercer Museum, has been converted into the James A. Michener Art Museum.  The borough also boasts a small music conservatory, writers' and artists' organizations, and other cultural activities.

Doylestown is located near the Polish-American Roman Catholic shrine known as the National Shrine of Our Lady of Czestochowa, which houses a painting of the Black Madonna of Częstochowa, Poland.

The Fountain House, a historic building, is located in Doylestown Borough.

Points of interest 
 Delaware Valley University
 Fonthill Museum
 Hepatitis B Foundation
 Henry Schmieder Arboretum
 James A. Michener Art Museum
 Mercer Museum
 Moravian Pottery and Tile Works
 National Shrine of Our Lady of Czestochowa
 Oscar Hammerstein II Farm
 Peace Valley Park
 Pearl S. Buck House
 Ringing Rocks Park

Government

Doylestown has a council-manager form of government consisting of a "weak" Mayor and a nine-member Borough Council. The Mayor is elected at-large to a term of four years. The Borough Council is divided into three wards, with each ward electing three members to terms of four years. Borough Council is in charge of enacting legislation, raising and spending public money, regulating land use, and providing public services. The council is required to meet once a month to conduct business. The Borough Council contains seven subcommittees.

As of 2022, the Mayor of Doylestown is Elnora "Noni" West. The Borough Council consists of Council President Jack O'Brien, Council Vice-President Wendy Margolis, Ben Bell, Tim Brennan, Lawrence Browne, Dennis Livrone, Joe Frederick, Jennifer Jarret, and Amy Taylor Popkin.

Education 

Doylestown borough is the location of several educational facilities of the Central Bucks School District.  The borough contains three elementary schools (Doyle Elementary, Cold Spring Elementary and Linden Elementary),  one middle school (Lenape Middle School)  and one high school (Central Bucks West) which has long been a football and girls' soccer powerhouse.  Bucks County's regional educational service agency, Bucks County Intermediate Unit No. 22, is also located in the borough.

Doylestown Township, which is adjacent to the borough, contains Paul W. Kutz Elementary and also the campus of Delaware Valley University, which is primarily known as an agricultural and science school.

Media
The Intelligencer, a daily newspaper serving central and northern Bucks County along with nearby areas of eastern Montgomery County, is headquartered in Doylestown. In 1948, WBUX signed-on with 5,000 watts at 1570 on the AM dial. Today as WISP the station airs an All-Catholic format.

Infrastructure

Transportation

The main north-south street in Doylestown is Main Street while the main east-west street is State Street, which forms a one-way pair with Oakland Avenue in the downtown area. Pennsylvania Route 611 bypasses central Doylestown to the west on a freeway, heading north to Easton and south to Philadelphia. U.S. Route 202 bypasses the center of the borough to the south and heads southwest to Norristown and northeast to New Hope. US 202 follows a parkway alignment from Doylestown southwest to Montgomeryville, with U.S. Route 202 Business serving as a business route to Montgomeryville, passing through New Britain and Chalfont. Pennsylvania Route 313 runs northwest-southeast along the northern edge of Doylestown on Swamp Road and heads northwest to Dublin and Quakertown and southeast to Pennsylvania Route 263 in Furlong, where Swamp Road continues as an unnumbered road towards Newtown. The downtown area of Doylestown has on-street parking and parking lots that are regulated by parking meters during the day Monday through Saturday, with parking free on evenings and Sunday.  The borough offers 6-month parking permits that can be used in certain metered spots. Free parking is available at the Bucks County Parking Garage on Broad Street.

The Lansdale/Doylestown Line of SEPTA Regional Rail connects Doylestown to Center City Philadelphia and many points in between. Doylestown station is the northernmost stop. Doylestown is served by SEPTA City Bus Route 55, which heads south to Warrington, Willow Grove, Abington, Jenkintown and finally the Olney Transportation Center in North Philadelphia.

There is also intercity bus service provided to Doylestown from a bus stop at the Doylestown station. Trans-Bridge Lines connects Doylestown to New Jersey and the Port Authority Bus Terminal in New York City along a route that originates in Quakertown. Greyhound Lines provides intercity bus service to Doylestown along a route running between the Philadelphia Greyhound Terminal and Scranton. Fullington Trailways provides intercity bus service to Doylestown along a route running between the Philadelphia Greyhound Terminal in Philadelphia and Williamsport, serving several places in northern Pennsylvania.

Locally, Doylestown is served by a small public transportation system called the "Doylestown DART" (Doylestown Area Regional Transit). Doylestown DART is a service of Bucks County Transport and consists of a single weekday route and a single Saturday route. Often used by the elderly, it travels to various destinations in Doylestown, including government offices, schools, stores, restaurants, pharmacies, senior residences, and Doylestown Hospital. Bucks County Transport also operates the DART West, which runs weekdays from a connection with the Doylestown DART at Delaware Valley University west to New Britain and Chalfont. The Bucks County Courthouse Shuttle is operated weekdays by Bucks County Transport.

The Doylestown Airport, a general aviation airport operated by the Bucks County Airport Authority, is located to the north of Doylestown. The nearest airports with commercial air service are the Trenton-Mercer Airport near Trenton, New Jersey, approximately 15 miles (26 km) away, Lehigh Valley International Airport near Allentown, Pennsylvania, approximately 25 miles (40 km) away,
Philadelphia International Airport in Philadelphia, approximately 30 miles (48 km) away and Newark Liberty International Airport in Newark, New Jersey, approximately 50 miles (80 km) away.

The system was founded in 1992 to improve mobility for pedestrians and bicyclists in and around the Doylestown area. The Doylestown Community Bike & Hike System has connections to the US 202 Parkway Trail following the US 202 parkway to Montgomeryville; future trail connections are planned to Peace Valley Park and other points in the area. BicyclePA Route S passes through Doylestown, following Court Street, the one-way pair of Oakland Avenue eastbound and State Street westbound, Main Street, and Green Street through the borough.

Utilities
Electricity and natural gas in Doylestown is provided by PECO Energy Company, a subsidiary of Exelon. The Doylestown Borough Water Department provides water to the borough and some surrounding areas. Bucks County Water and Sewer owns and operates the sewer system in Doylestown. Trash and recycling collection in Doylestown is provided by the borough's Public Works department.

Health care
Doylestown Health operates the Doylestown Hospital on West State Street serving the borough and surrounding areas in the northern suburbs of Philadelphia. The hospital was founded in 1923. Doylestown Hospital consists of 232 beds and offers an emergency room along with various inpatient and outpatient services including cancer care, a stroke center, a chest pain center, and maternity services.

Notable people

 Kristen Alderson and Eddie Alderson, sibling actors
 Robert C. Atherton, former magazine editor, writer, and artist 
 Stefan Avalos, motion picture director
 Balance and Composure, alternative rock band
 Amos W. Barber, former surgeon and second governor of Wyoming.
 Christian Bauman, novelist and NPR commentator
Stan and Jan Berenstain, former authors of the Berenstain Bears
 Bill Bloom, "Double Dutch Bus" composer
 Kathy Boockvar, former Pennsylvania Secretary of State
 Władysław Bortnowski, former Polish general
 Pearl S. Buck, former Nobel Prize-winning author
 Clarence Buckman, politician
 Alan Campbell, actor and author
 Gil Cohen, aviation artist
 Caroline Doty, guard on UConn Huskies women's basketball team
 Molly Ephraim, actress
 William Edgar Geil, evangelist, explorer, lecturer, photographer, and author of 10 books related to his travels
 David Gordon, classical tenor
 Anthony Green, musician
 Scott Green, NFL referee
 Justin Guarini, American Idol runner-up
 Oscar Hammerstein II, musical lyricist
 Moss Hart, playwright and director
 Annie Haslam, singer, songwriter, artist
 Samantha Hoopes, model
 Charles T. Horner Jr., U.S. Army officer
 Edward L. Howard, politician
 Joe Judge, New York Giants head coach 
 George S. Kaufman, pioneering figure in American musical theater
 Margaret Mead, anthropologist
 Henry Chapman Mercer, archaeologist
 Natalie Mering, musician professionally known as Weyes Blood
 James A. Michener, author
 Irene Molloy, singer/actress
 Anthony Morelli, blogger
 Jeff Musselman, former MLB pitcher
 Kevin Nalty, YouTube personality
 Dorothy Parker, author
 S. J. Perelman, humorist
 Mike Pettine, Cleveland Browns head coach
 P!nk, singer
 Mike Senica, race car driver
 Charles Sheeler, artist
 Sinch, rock band
 Michael Smerconish, radio and TV host
 Dodie Smith, author
 Stephen Sondheim, composer
 Timothy Stack, actor
 Stephen Susco, motion picture screenwriter
 Dave Taber, retired soccer player
 Jean Toomer, author
 Jon Van Dine, drummer of indie-pop band CRUISR
 Jeremy Kipp Walker, film producer
 John Hosea Washburn, college president
 Foster Winans, journalist, convicted of insider trading
 Matt Wisniewski, artist

In popular culture 
Doylestown has been mentioned many times in contemporary popular culture, including:
The plot of the ongoing HBO series The Gilded Age, which premiered in 2022, revolves around two separate Doylestown families who relocate to New York City in the late 1800s.
In 2009, the movie Revenge of the Don, which premiered at the British Film Festival, was filmed in Doylestown. Its plot involves a horrible joke gone wrong.
The 2002 ESPN documentary The Last Game, tells the story of Central Bucks High School West's football team and its long-standing coach Mike Pettine as the team seeks to defend its 30-game winning streak against major eastern Pennsylvania high school football powerhouses in Pettine's final season before retirement. The documentary is highly acclaimed with the first sentence of The Los Angeles Times review of it reading: "This may be one the best sports documentaries ever made."
In 2002, Doylestown was the location for most of M. Night Shyamalan's film Signs.
In 2002, Doylestown also is a central part of the plot in "Carbon Creek", the September 25, 2002, episode of Star Trek: Enterprise.
In 1809, H. Beam Piper mentions Doylestown in his science fiction short story, "He Walked Around the Horses", in which British diplomat Benjamin Bathurst is sent to a parallel universe in which the American Revolution was a failure. Beneath the plot's surface is the fact that Rathurst really did mysteriously disappear in 1809 in Prussia during the Napoleonic Wars.

See also 
Poverty Resolutions (2010)

References

External links

 Borough of Doylestown

County seats in Pennsylvania
Populated places established in 1745
Boroughs in Bucks County, Pennsylvania
1838 establishments in Pennsylvania
1745 establishments in Pennsylvania